Singha Sattal, also known as Silyan Sattal is a 13th-century shelter located in the Kathmandu Durbar Square and It was built alongside the iconic Kasthamandap. Singha Sattal is owned by Guthi Sansthan, a state-owned enterprise. In the corners of the shelter, there are four bronze lions.

References

External links
 

Kathmandu District
Kathmandu Durbar Square
World Heritage Sites in Nepal
13th-century establishments in Nepal